Capella University is a private for-profit, online university headquartered in Minneapolis, Minnesota. The school is owned by the publicly traded Strategic Education, Inc. and delivers most of its education online.

Capella has 52 degree programs with over 1,900 online courses. Approximately 38,000 students are enrolled from all 50 states and 61 other countries, with 23 percent enrolled in doctoral programs, 47 percent enrolled in master's programs, and 27 percent enrolled in bachelor's programs.

History
Capella University was originally established as The Graduate School of America by Dr. Harold Abel and Stephen Shank in 1993. Shank was the former CEO of Tonka. Abel, formerly the president of Castleton State College, Central Michigan University, and Walden University, became the first president of the institution.

In 1997, Capella University received regional accreditation. Two years later the parent company and university were renamed Capella Education Company and Capella University, respectively. In 2000, Capella began to offer bachelor's degree programs.

In 2005, Capella Education Company announced their intention to go public with an initial public offering. In 2006, they became a publicly traded company (NASDAQ: CPLA), raising $80 million with the offering.

In 2007, Capella was named one of 86 higher education institutions in the United States to have received the National Centers of Academic Excellence in Information Assurance Education (CAE/IAE) designation by the National Security Agency (NSA). The designation was valid for the academic years 2007 through 2012.

In March 2008, Capella Education Company, longtime occupant of the 225 South Sixth skyscraper in downtown Minneapolis, signed a new lease that expanded its office and renamed the building Capella Tower. The building houses all of the company's 1,150 downtown Minneapolis administrative staff.

In 2009, The Project Management Institute (PMI) Global Accreditation Center for Project Management (GAC) accredited two Capella University online degree programs: the MS in Information Technology with a specialization in Project Management; and the BS in Information Technology with a specialization in Project Management. It also launched its School of Public Service Leadership.

In 2010, Capella, along with three other schools, was awarded the CHEA Award for Outstanding Institutional Practice in Student Learning Outcomes by The Council for Higher Education Accreditation.

In August 2018, Capella University's parent company Capella Education merged with Strayer Education Inc. to form Strategic Education, Inc.

In 2019, Capella added learning sites in Atlanta, Georgia and Orlando, Florida.

Controversies

U.S. Department of Education compliance audit
In 2006, the United States Department of Education, Office of the Inspector General (OIG) began a compliance audit of Capella. OIG focused on the university's policies and procedures concerning the return of Title IV funds as required by Federal Law for students who failed to give official notice that they were withdrawing from the school. The OIG found that Capella made accounting mistakes in how it calculated student eligibility for government-subsidized loans, including failing to return all funds disbursed on behalf of students who dropped out before their first day of class. Capella, in a response to the audit, says it recognizes some past shortcomings in its accounting practices and has made changes to ensure that such errors are not repeated.

Criticism of marketing expenses and executive compensation
In 2012, Capella received criticism for its expenditures on marketing, profit, and CEO pay rather than instruction, and its use of aggressive recruiting practices. According to a report issued by former U.S. Senator Tom Harkin for the Senate Education Committee, approximately 79% of the institution's cash flow comes from US government Title IV payments, including Pell grants. The report concluded that Capella's recruiting and student services were better managed than most other for-profit competitors, especially among graduate degree students. The high withdrawal rate among Bachelor's student hopefuls, the over-reliance on part-time instructors, and the high relative marketing budget were cited as potential causes for concern.

Class action lawsuit
In 2018, a lawsuit was filed against Capella in the U.S. District Court for the District of Minnesota alleging that the school "violated doctoral students' rights by creating a process intended to ensure that it would be difficult, if not impossible, for students to timely complete, or complete at all, their doctoral programs." The school rejected the lawsuit's claims, stating that the court had thrown out the majority of the legal claims.

Academics
According to College Navigator, Capella's faculty consists of 207 full-time instructors and 1,321 part-time instructors.

Undergraduate applicants who do not have any credits eligible for transfer must successfully complete a university-approved examination to be considered for admission.

Capella's enrollment is composed mainly of graduate students including 47 percent MS/MBA students and 23 percent PhD/PsyD doctoral students. The undergraduate population of Capella makes up 27 percent of the student body. Less than one percent are working on certificate programs. The average age of a Capella student is 40. Ninety-five percent of students are enrolled part-time, 74 percent are female, and 54 percent are ethnic minorities.

Capella allows a limited number of credits to be earned through a prior learning assessment program, which can provide college credit for past experiences.

Accreditation
Capella University is accredited by the Higher Learning Commission. Baccalaureate and graduate level teacher education programs are accredited by the National Council for Accreditation of Teacher Education. The graduate level counseling program is accredited by The Council for Accreditation of Counseling and Related Educational Programs (CACREP). Baccalaureate and graduate level nursing programs are accredited by the Commission on Collegiate Nursing Education. Baccalaureate and graduate level business programs have been accredited by the Accreditation Council for Business Schools and Programs since 2014. Baccalaureate level information technology programs have been accredited by the Accreditation Board for Engineering and Technology, Inc (ABET).

Notable alumni
 Rafael C. Castillo, PhD, First Editor of ViAztlan: A Journal of Chicano Arts and Letters
 Tammy Duckworth, PhD, United States Senator from Illinois
 Christopher Erhardt, PhD, American video game designer and retired professor
 Josh Haeder, BS, 33rd State Treasurer of South Dakota
 Irene Muloni, MBA, Minister for Energy and Minerals in the Ugandan Cabinet
Arthur Seale, PhD, convicted kidnapper and murderer
 Linda L. Singh, PhD, adjutant general of the Maryland National Guard
 Brandt Smith, PhD, member of the Arkansas House of Representatives from Jonesboro, Arkansas
 Jennifer Welter, PhD, American football player and first woman to coach in a men's professional football league
 Xavier Woods, PhD, professional WWE wrestler

References

External links
 Official website

Distance education institutions based in the United States
For-profit universities and colleges in the United States
Universities and colleges in Minneapolis
Education companies established in 1993
Educational institutions established in 1993
1993 establishments in Minnesota